Sister Elizabeth Memorial Hospital was a hospital in the Sunset Park neighborhood of Brooklyn, New York.  It was located at 362 51st Street, between Third Avenue and Fourth Avenue and was absorbed by Lutheran Medical Center during the 1980s.

See also
 List of hospitals in New York City

References

Defunct hospitals in Brooklyn
Maternity hospitals in the United States
Sunset Park, Brooklyn
History of women in New York City